Linda Jaivin (born 27 March 1955) is an American-born Australian translator, essayist, novelist and sinologist.

Early life
Linda Jaivin was born in New London, Connecticut, to a Jewish family of Russian heritage. Her grandfathers were Jewish refugees from Tsarist Russia, who emigrated to Argentina and the United States. Her interest in China led her to undertake Chinese studies at Brown University in Rhode Island. She moved to Taiwan in 1977 to deepen her knowledge of Chinese culture and language. Moving to Hong Kong in 1979, her first job there was editing textbooks for Oxford University Press. She worked for Asiaweek magazine, where she met the Australian scholar Geremie Barmé, whom she later married. They returned to Canberra, Australia in 1986. They divorced in 1994. She now lives in Sydney.

Work
Jaivin has written a memoir of her experiences as a translator in China, The Monkey and the Dragon, as well as a number of novels. She co-edited an anthology on dissident writers in China, New Ghosts, Old Dreams:Chinese Rebel Voices with Geremie Barmé, in 1992. Jaivin has contributed to a number of magazines including the Australian magazine of politics and culture, The Monthly. She wrote for the Quarterly Essay Found in Translation: In Praise of a Plural World in November 2013. She has subtitled many Chinese films, including Farewell my Concubine and The Grandmaster. Jaivin has been a guest on the ABC radio program The Book Show and a panelist on Q&A and other programs.

Bibliography

Novels

Non-fiction 

 Review of Anne Manne's The Life of I.

Films (as sub-titler) 
 Farewell My Concubine (Chen Kaige, 1993)
 Hero (Zhang Yimou, 2002)
 The Grandmaster (Wong Kar-wai, 2013)

References

External links 
 
 Jaivin is a member of The Australian Society of Authors

Living people
1955 births
20th-century Australian novelists
20th-century translators
20th-century Australian women writers
21st-century Australian novelists
21st-century translators
21st-century Australian women writers
American emigrants to Australia
Australian columnists
Australian translators
Australian women novelists
Jewish Australian writers
Chinese–English translators
Subtitlers
The Monthly people
Australian women columnists
Writers from Connecticut
Grunge lit authors
American sinologists
Australian sinologists
Writers about China
Women orientalists
Jewish women writers
Jewish translators
Jewish novelists